Amia, AMIA, or AMiA may refer to:

Amia (fish), a genus of fish
American Medical Informatics Association
Anglican Mission in the Americas 
Asociación Mutual Israelita Argentina, a Jewish community center in Buenos Aires, Argentina
AMIA bombing, a 1994 terrorist attack 
Association of Moving Image Archivists
Aviation and Maritime Investigation Authority, an agency of the government of Slovakia
Mizuki Akiyama, online alias "Amia", a fictional character from Project Sekai: Colorful Stage! feat. Hatsune Miku

See also
Australian Interactive Media Industry Association, or AMIA
Aimia (company), a frequent flyer loyalty program company